International Tennis Open is a sports video game developed by Infogrames Multimedia and co-published by Philips Interactive Media and Pathé Interactive in 1992. It was released on Philips CD-i, Macintosh, and DOS. It was a pack-in game for some CD-i models. The UK version of the game is available in French and English as it is a French game.

Plot 
Players take on the role of "Victor Player" - An experienced player whose nationality depends on what language has been selected. There are several different gameplay styles. Match - Allows players to play a single game of tennis. Tournament - Allows players to play a series of games against various opponents. Training - Allows players to practice before playing a game. This involved playing against a ball throwing machine.

In between or at the start of games, sports commentator George Eddy would comment on the game.

Reception
GamePro gave the CD-i version a perfect score, lauding the game for its "awesome, realistic, rotoscoped graphics and animation similar to, but more fluid than, Delphine Software's Flashback", its realistic sounds, and its challenging AI opponents.

References

External links 
http://www.mobygames.com/game/cd-i/international-tennis-open

Tennis video games
1992 video games
CD-i games
DOS games
Classic Mac OS games
Pack-in video games
Video games developed in France
Video games with digitized sprites